Finnish tribes (Finnish: Suomalaiset Heimot) are ancient ethnic groups from which over time Finns evolved.

In 1548 in his New Testament Mikael Agricola mentions that Finnish tribes are Finns, Tavastians and Karelians. The same division can also be seen in typical brooches that women wore in the 12th to 14th centuries. However, the metal culture, especially jewelry and weapons, had already evolved into distinctive and peculiar in the end of the Merovingian period in the 8th century in the area of contemporary Finland. The intention of this evolution was possibly to express specifically "Finnish" identity which was born from the image of common origin and mutual similarity.

Finnish tribes are frequently mentioned in historical sources, such as papal letters, Novgorod First Chronicle and Eric Chronicles.

References

Ethnic groups in Finland